Taylors Head  is a rural community on the Eastern Shore of the  Halifax Regional Municipality in the Canadian province of Nova Scotia.

References
Explore HRM
Taylors Head Destination Nova Scotia

Communities in Halifax, Nova Scotia